Fatal Accidents Act is a stock short title used in the United Kingdom for legislation relating to fatal accidents.

List
Acts of the Parliament of the United Kingdom
The Fatal Accidents Act 1846 (9 & 10 Vict c 93), also known as Lord Campbell's Act
The Fatal Accidents Act 1864 (27 & 28 Vict c 95)
The Fatal Accidents Act 1959 (7 & 8 Eliz 2 c 65)
The Fatal Accidents Act 1976 (c 30)

The Fatal Accidents Inquiry (Scotland) Act 1895 (58 & 59 Vict c 36)
The Fatal Accidents and Sudden Deaths Inquiry (Scotland) Act 1906 (6 Edw 7 c 35)
The Fatal Accidents and Sudden Deaths Inquiry (Scotland) Act 1976 (c 14)

Northern Ireland Orders in Council

The following order is considered to be primary legislation:
The Fatal Accidents (Northern Ireland) Order 1977 (SI 1977/1251) (NI 18)

See also
List of short titles

Lists of legislation by short title